1990 Korean Professional Football League was the second season for Ilhwa Chunma. They finished the season at the bottom of the league table.

Staff

Coaching staff 
Manager :  Park Jong-Hwan
Coach :  Won Hong-Jae
Trainer :  Lee Jang-Soo
Team Physician :  Lee Sang-Don

Squad 
Goalkeeper
 Kim Young-Ho,  Na Chi-Seon,  Marcel Lazareanu
Defender
 Kim Kyung-Bum,  Moon Won-Geun,  Lim Jong-Heon,  Jung Young-Ho,  Bang In-Woong, 
 Kim Jae-So,  Han Yeon-Su,  Kim Ki-Wan
Midfielder
 Kim Hyun-Seok,  Choi Chung-Il,  Kim Young-Joo,  Lee Sang-Yoon,  Park Jong-Dae, 
 Park Sang-Rok,  Ha Sung-Jun,  Oh Dong-Cheon,  Ahn Ik-Soo,  Park Doo-Heung
Forward
 Yoo Seung-Gwan,  Ko Jeong-Woon,  Baek Jong-Chul,  Kim Yong-Se,  Kim I-Ju, 
 Son Woong-Jung

Season results

KPFL table

Personal awards 

Best XI : Lim Jong-Heon

Matches

References 

Seongnam FC seasons
South Korean football clubs 1990 season